The Carpathian Trophy is an annual men's and women's friendly handball tournament organised by the Romanian Handball Federation:
 men's competition
 women's competition

 
Recurring sporting events established in 1959
1959 establishments in Romania
International handball competitions hosted by Romania